The epithet the Cruel has been applied to the following:

People:
Boleslaus I, Duke of Bohemia (died 967 or 972)
Fruela I of Asturias (died 768), King of Asturias
Peter of Castile (1334-1369), King of Castile and León

Fictional characters:
Gorthaur the Cruel, another name for Sauron, villain of The Lord of the Rings
Kalibak, a DC Comics deity and supervillain
Kiber the Cruel, a Marvel Comics supervillain
Slagar the Cruel, a villain from the children's novel Mattimeo

See also
List of people known as the Grim

Lists of people by epithet